Capparimyia melanaspis is a species of tephritid or fruit flies in the genus Capparimyia of the family Tephritidae.

References

Dacinae